Now That's What I Call Music! 40 was released on November 8, 2011. The album is the 40th edition of the Now! series in the United States. To celebrate the release of its 40th disc, two versions were released: the standard edition containing "16 of the hottest tracks from the last few months", including the Billboard Hot 100 number-one hit, "Moves Like Jagger", and a two-disc Deluxe Edition set that "includes all the hits in the standard set, as well as the greatest hits from the last several years featured on previous sets." Also included on the second disc are two songs not featured on prior Now installments - but still reached the top 5 of the Billboard Hot 100 - "Low" by Flo Rida and "Cry Me A River" by Justin Timberlake.

Now! 40 debuted at number three on the Billboard 200 albums chart. The album has sold 703,000 copies as of May 2012.

Track listing

Deluxe Edition (Disc 2)

Reception

Allmusic critic Andy Kellman states that when Now! 40 was released in November 2011, half of the 16 "proper" tracks were in the top 20 of the Billboard Hot 100, but the inclusion of Nickelback's "When We Stand Together" must have been for "stylistic variety" as the "lone representative for macho rock" on the album. Otherwise, "the disc is stocked with major dance-pop singles."

Charts

Weekly charts

Year-end charts

References

External links
 Official U.S. Now That's What I Call Music website

2011 compilation albums
 040
EMI Records compilation albums